The 2014 Akron Zips men's soccer team will represent The University of Akron during the 2014 NCAA Division I men's soccer season. It will be the 65th season of the university fielding a program. The Zips enter the season as the two-time defending MAC Men's Soccer Tournament champions.

Schedule

References 

Akron Zips
Akron Zips men's soccer seasons
Akron Zips
Akron Zips